Daniel Castro Barcala (born 19 April 1997) is a Spanish archer. He competed in the men's individual event at the 2020 Summer Olympics. He won the silver medal in the men's team recurve event at the 2022 European Archery Championships held in Munich, Germany.

References

External links
 
 
 
 

1997 births
Living people
Spanish male archers
Olympic archers of Spain
Archers at the 2020 Summer Olympics
Place of birth missing (living people)
European Games competitors for Spain
Archers at the 2019 European Games
Competitors at the 2022 Mediterranean Games
Mediterranean Games medalists in archery
Mediterranean Games silver medalists for Spain
21st-century Spanish people